

Cook and Westmoreland was an electoral district of the Legislative Assembly in the Australian state of New South Wales in the first and second Parliaments (1856–1859), named after Cook and Westmoreland counties in the Blue Mountains, Lithgow and Oberon areas. It elected two members simultaneously, with voters casting two votes and the first two candidates being elected. It was largely replaced by Hartley, however both members moved to other electorates, James Martin became the member for East Sydney, while Robert Jamison became the member for Nepean.

Member for Cook and Westmoreland

Election results
There was only one contested election held in the district, in the 1856 New South Wales colonial election. James Martin twice resigned in 1856 and 1857 as a result of accepting appointment as Attorney General, however on both occasions he was re-elected unopposed.

1856

1858

References

Cook and Westmoreland
Constituencies established in 1856
Constituencies disestablished in 1859
1856 establishments in Australia
1859 disestablishments in Australia